Kaka Ferskur (Fresh Rolls) or The New Adventures of Pippi Longstocking is a 1988 film written and directed by Todd Hughes. Kaka Ferskur satirizes coming of age from a "Pippi Longstockings" view. The movie shows the characters either as young adults or as real adults who won't grow up. In this film, men often play female roles, with squeaky voices dubbed over the men's voices. Pippi Longstocking is played by comic Walter Barnett.

Plot
In Kaka Ferskur, Pippi meets Age, a Swedish ghost at the beach. He challenges her by saying if she can prove to him that she isn't growing up, she may remain a child, living with her pets in her grand mansion, "Villa Villekulla". But if she loses the bet, she must admit to Age in the end that she is coming of age and must leave childish things behind.

She later catches up with her friends Annika and Tommy, and they go to Hollywood. There, Tommy loses the girls, and they embark on a journey to find him. On the journey, they see a man nude, enjoy hot, fresh rolls (hence Kaka Ferskur), and do other things like get drunk and throw rolls at adults.

Cast
Walter Barnett as Pippi
Tina Lyons as Annika
Kai Mortensen as Tommy
Anders Stephenson as Age (Swedish Ghost)
Billy Wright as Papaw
Marya Dosti as Apalachia Annie
John D'Amico as Nasty McFlasher
Justin Tanner as Swedish Buttermaid
David Carpender as Dale
Jon Amirkhan as Circus Liquor Clerk
Andy Daley as Rufus
Devon Williams as Sad Swedish Girl
Larry Johnson as Pookie Dewar

External links
Kaka Ferskur at the IMDb

1988 films
Films based on Pippi Longstocking
1988 comedy films
American comedy films
1980s English-language films
1980s American films